Lai Lai Win (born 9 February 1977) is a Burmese sprinter. She won a silver medal for the women's 400 metres at the 2007 Southeast Asian Games in Bangkok, Thailand, with a time of 55.11 seconds.

Win represented Myanmar at the 2008 Summer Olympics in Beijing, where she competed for the women's 200 metres. She ran in the fourth heat against seven other athletes, including Bahrain's Roqaya Al-Gassra, and Jamaica's Kerron Stewart, both of whom were heavy favorites in this event. She finished the race in last place by three quarters of a second (0.75) behind Barbados' Jade Bailey, with a time of 24.37 seconds. Win, however, failed to advance into the quarterfinals, as she placed forty-third overall, and was ranked below four mandatory slots for the next round.

References

External links
 

NBC 2008 Olympics profile

Burmese female sprinters
Living people
Olympic athletes of Myanmar
Athletes (track and field) at the 2008 Summer Olympics
1977 births
Athletes (track and field) at the 2010 Asian Games
Southeast Asian Games medalists in athletics
Southeast Asian Games silver medalists for Myanmar
Competitors at the 2007 Southeast Asian Games
Asian Games competitors for Myanmar
Olympic female sprinters